The Salt Clay Creek railway disaster was one of Australia's first railway accidents involving multiple fatalities. It occurred on 25 January 1885, when a mail train from Albury to Sydney failed to negotiate the culvert over a flooded creek, around 5km from Cootamundra. Seven people were killed (see their names under Fatalities below) and dozens seriously injured.

History

Background 
The Main Southern railway line from Sydney to Albury was officially inaugurated on 3 February 1881. Wodonga, on the other side of the Murray River, which served as the border between the two colonies, had been connected by the North East railway line to Melbourne since November 1873. The Sydney Express, between Australia's two most populous cities officially began on 14 June 1883 when that broad gauge line was extended over the Murray River to Albury and passengers and goods were able, customs permitting, to cross from one side of No.1 platform to the other, and continue their journey.

The accident

The Melbourne–Sydney Express did not run on Sundays. Instead, it was the mail (stopping all stations) train which left Albury for Sydney on the afternoon of 25 January 1885 with around 50 passengers, perhaps as many as sixteen being in a party of Melbourne bookmakers off to the lucrative Anniversary Day races at Randwick, among them Joe "Leviathan" Thompson and John Pattison. The driver of the train, comprising only two carriages, sleeping car, and the mail and guard's (brake) vans, was Andy Moody, his fireman Dick Wall, and the guard Sam Murray. The number of stops between Albury and Wagga is not recorded, but those succeeding are known with some certainty:
The train left Wagga Wagga at 17:15 in heavy rain, Junee junction at 18:20 or 18:30, Illabo at 18:55, and Bethungra at 19:14, the driver having been given the "all clear" by the station-master. At 19:45 it was not yet dark, when coming around a slight curve the driver saw that the line was totally submerged under the fast-flowing creek. He applied the air brake, but too late. The culvert over the Salt Clay Creek being unable to handle the flow, the torrent washed over the railway line. The track ballast washed away and the rails and sleepers, no longer supported, gave way and the train broke up and sunk into the creek. 
In Cootamundra that afternoon, George Hawke and his mate James Hicks became aware of the danger posed to the train by flooded lines, and set off towards Bethungra. They traversed one washaway at a spot called "The Gap" and were prepared to warn the train, but being unaware of the washaway at the Salt Clay Creek crossing, wasted valuable time removing logs from the line, and were only aware of their error when they heard the sound of the crash.
When the rails gave way, the locomotive and its tender had made it to firmer ground on the far side, but then fell back on the second-class carriage, which was destroyed. The sleeper car, in which most or all of the bookmaking party were housed, remained intact but fortuitously it was unroofed, otherwise many would have been trapped and drowned. Several of the "metallicians" worked heroically to rescue passengers, but Thompson, who was badly injured, declined to assist, saying he had enough trouble just saving himself. The first-class carriage remained intact but was flooded, but the mail van following was shattered and both employees died. The guard's (brake) van survived intact. 

Having survived the derailment, guard Murray made it a matter of priority to stop the goods train which was known to be following half an hour behind. Hawkes, having failed to intercept the train, returned to Cootamundra to enlist the aid of the town's two medical doctors, Charles Combe and Alfred Agassiz, then helped rescue the injured, who were accommodated at John Hurley's homestead and at the Hotel Albion. Joe LeSueur borrowed a horse and cart and was able to carry a few injured survivors back to Cootamundra, where a makeshift hospital was set up in Mark Solomon's Assembly Hall in Parker Street.

At the inquest, the government was held liable for the accident by virtue of the culvert design.
The line was washed away in two other places, closer to Cootamundra, by the same weather event.

The culvert was replaced with a substantial iron bridge.

Two years later a similar unprecedented flood undermined the track on the Sydney side of Illabo, not 30km distant, also on a Sunday, but was discovered by fettlers before the mail train was due.

Fatalities 
Those killed directly, drowned, or died of injuries were:
Three railways employees:
Alfred Wilson, train conductor, who was in the sleeping car, and
John O'Dwyer, the mail guard, trapped and drowned in the mail van
Joseph Campey of Harden, a railways fireman, but returning home as a passenger. His son William became a railways officer
Mrs John Hodson, wife of a Wagga contractor or ironmonger
John Hade, whose parents kept the Royal Hotel, Carcoar and
his uncle William Bergin, a butcher from Wagga, who were returning to Carcoar.
Harry Holmes, about whom little has been found. Earlier reports named that body as belonging to Robert Crawford, who was later found alive and not involved.
Another mystery was the discovery of a bag bearing the name of Miss Louisa Wales, a passenger to Cootamundra, of whom no trace or further information.
25 passengers were listed as injured.

Notes and references

External links 
Wayne Doubleday "At the Archives: Salt Clay Creek accident" Charles Sturt University archives in Riverina Weekender 2/3 June 2012

Railway accidents in 1885
Railway accidents and incidents in New South Wales